Bosnia and Herzegovina has facilities for road, rail and air transport. There are five international road routes and 20 state highways, with bus connections to many countries. Railways total just over 1,000 km with links to Croatia and Serbia. There are 25 airports, seven of them with paved runways. The Sava River is navigable, but its use is limited.

Roadways
total: 21,846 km
paved: 11,425 km (4,686 km of interurban roads)
unpaved: 10,421 km (2006)

Roads

International
E65
E73 (Pan-European corridor Vc), A1 highway
E661
E761
E762

State highways

 M-1.8
 M-2
 M-4
 M-4.2
 M-5
 M-6
 M-6.1
 M-8
 M-11
 M-14
 M-14.1
 M-14.2
 M-15
 M-16
 M-16.1
 M-16.2
 M-16.3
 M-16.4
 M-17
 M-17.2
 M-17.3
 M-18
 M-19
 M-19.2
 M-19.3
 M-20

National and international bus services
Bosnia & Herzegovina is well connected to other countries in Europe. The main bus station of Sarajevo has its own website. The main provider of international bus connection in Bosnia & Herzegovina is Eurolines. There are routes to Croatia, Germany, Austria, France, Netherlands, Montenegro, Belgium, Denmark, Sweden and Serbia. Despite Bosnia & Herzegovina's geographical closeness to Serbia, there is only one bus a day, which takes more than 8 hours due to the lack of proper roads.

Railways

Total: 1,032 km standard gauge:   (2006)

Rail links with adjacent countries
 Same gauge: 
 Croatia - yes
 Serbia - yes
 Montenegro - no

Waterways
Sava River (northern border) open to shipping but use is limited (2008)

Ports and harbours
Gradiška, Brod, Šamac, and Brčko (all inland waterway ports on the Sava none of which are fully operational), Orašje, Bosnia

Merchant marine
none (1999 est.)

Airports
Air transport begin in Bosnia and Herzegovina during the period of the Kingdom of Yugoslavia when the flag-carrier Aeroput inaugurated a regular flight linking the national capital Belgrade with Podgorica in 1930, with a stop in Sarajevo. A year later Aeroput inaugurated another regular flight starting in Belgrade and then stopping in Sarajevo and continuing towards Split, Sušak and Zagreb. By mid-1930s Aeroput inaugurated two routes linking Belgrade and Zagreb with Dubrovnik through Sarajevo, and, in 1938, it inaugurated an international route linking Dubrovnik, which was becoming a major holiday destination, through Sarajevo, to Zagreb, Vienna, Brno and Prague.

25 (2008)

Airports - with paved runways
total:
7
2,438 to 3,047 m:
4
1,524 to 2,437 m:
1
under 914 m:
2 (2008)

Airports - with unpaved runways
total:
18
1,524 to 2,437 m:
1
914 to 1,523 m:
7
under 914 m:
10 (2008)

Heliports
6 (2013)

See also
 Bosnia and Herzegovina

References

External links

We recommend to use for travel shuttle bus transfers in Bosnia and Hercegovina. It is one of the easiest ways to travel here.